Basel Tattoo is an annual military tattoo show performed by International military bands, display teams, popular musicians, and tattoo formations in Basel, Switzerland.

Since 2006, Basel Tattoo has had annual stage-arena performances within the Basel Kaserne (old barracks) (now also known as Basel Tattoo Arena) and hosts two parades in July. The Basel Tattoo parade, with an estimated 125,000 visitors, is considered the largest event.

History 

The Basel Tattoo was started in 2006 by the local Top Secret Drum Corps. It has grown to be the world's second largest military tattoo in terms of performers and budget after the Edinburgh Military Tattoo. The event is now sponsored by the Swiss Federal Department of Defence, Civil Protection and Sport (DDPS), making it the official military tattoo of Switzerland.

In 2008, the Basel Tattoo began holding a parade in Basel to showcase the performers to a wider audience. A second parade was added in Freiburg im Breisgau, Germany the following year.

In 2012, the Basel Tattoo festival had about 2,000 performers and was seen by 260,000 people during 15 live stage-arena performances and two parades.

In 2014, 120,000 spectators attended the performances at Basel Tattoo Arena, 125,000 viewed the parades in Basel and Freiburg, and 450,000 viewers watched a televised presentation on SRF 1.

In 2015, 15 arena performances in nine days will feature 30 performing acts from Switzerland, Australia, Canada, Germany, Ireland, Italy, New Zealand, Oman, South Africa, South Korea, the United Kingdom (groups from England and Scotland) and the United States. One of the main highlights is expected to be the performances of the  Blue Devils International Corps, a 97-member drum and bugle corps made up of alumni of the 16–time Drum Corps International (DCI) world champion Blue Devils Drum and Bugle Corps of Concord, California and eight other DCI World Class corps.

2015 performance
The eleventh annual Basel Tattoo had 30 formations from five continents giving 15 performances over nine days.

From Friday, July 17 through Saturday, July 25, 2015, a total of 15 shows were planned with an estimated 120,000 visitors.

Scheduled performers (2015):
 102 Battalion REME Pipes and Drums– United Kingdom
 Ailsa Craig Highland Dancers– Scotland
 Band of the Royal Regiment of Scotland– Scotland
 Basel Tattoo Choir– Switzerland
 Basel Tattoo Garde– Switzerland
 Basler Mittwoch-Gesellschaft– Switzerland
 Blue Devils International Corps– United States
 Castle Stars Irish Dancers– Ireland
 Chloë Agnew– Ireland
 Drums and Pipes of the Aberdeen Universities Officers' Training Corps– Scotland
 Drums and Pipes of the Cape Town Highlanders– South Africa
 Egon Eggemann– Switzerland
 Fanfara 8th Regimento Bersaglieri– Italy
 Imps Motorcycle Display Team– England
 New Zealand Army Band– New Zealand
 Pipes and Drums of the Royal Scots Borderers, 1st Battalion, the Royal Regiment of Scotland– Scotland
 Republic of Korea Air Force Band– South Korea
 Royal Air Force of Oman Pipes and Drums– Oman
 Royal Army of Oman Pipes and Drums– Oman
 Scots Guards Association (Manchester) Pipes and Drums– England
 Sektion Rhone– Switzerland
 South Australia Pipes and Drums– Australia
 Swiss Army Central Band– Switzerland
 Swiss Highlanders– Switzerland
 Temuka Pipe Band– New Zealand
 The Band of The Household Cavalry– United Kingdom
 Top Secret Drum Corps– Switzerland
 War Horse– South Africa
 Will Martin– New Zealand

In addition to the stage performances in the Basel Kaserne (old barracks), the 2015 Basel Tattoo also has following shows:
 Basel Tattoo parade in Basel
 Basel Tattoo parade in Freiburg, Germany
 Broadcast on SRF 1 Swiss television

References

External links 

 
 Tourism Basel

Military tattoos